Agathe Max is a French violinist based in Lyon mainly active in the experimental music scene.

Agathe Max plays electric violin combined with electronics, stomp boxes and a loop station. She collaborated with a series of other experimental musicians such as Rhys Chatham, Carla Bozulich, Jonathan Kane, Alexander Tucker, Lucio Capece, David Daniell, Yoko Higashi, Animal Hospital, Melt-Banana and with dancers like Juha Marsalo, Carolyn Carlson.
Besides her musical career, Max is also active as a visual artist. Max has played on the Supersonic Festival, Roadburn, ISSUE Project Room, Electron Festival. Her 2008 cd This Silver String was released on Xeric, a sublabel of Table of the Elements Records.

Discography
 Solace The Grizzly, 2006
 Sonic Live, 2007, Angry Ballerina Records
 This Silver String, 2008, Xeric
 Dangerous Days, 2012, Inglorious Records

References

External links
 Agathe Max on Myspace

Year of birth missing (living people)
Living people
Musicians from Lyon
French experimental musicians
Women in electronic music
21st-century French women violinists